Girolamo Asteo, O.F.M. Conv. (1562 – 1626) was a Roman Catholic prelate who served as Bishop of Veroli (1608–1626).

Biography
Girolamo Asteo was born in 1562 and ordained a priest in the Order of Friars Minor Conventual.
On 17 November 1608, he was appointed during the papacy of Pope Paul V as Bishop of Veroli.
On 23 November 1608, he was consecrated bishop by Marcello Lante della Rovere, Bishop of Todi, with Giovanni Battista del Tufo, Bishop Emeritus of Acerra, and Paolo de Curtis, Bishop Emeritus of Isernia, serving as co-consecrators. 
He served as Bishop of Veroli until his death on 15 August 1626.

References

External links and additional sources
 (for Chronology of Bishops) 
 (for Chronology of Bishops) 

17th-century Italian Roman Catholic bishops
Bishops appointed by Pope Paul V
1562 births
1626 deaths
Conventual Franciscan bishops